Joshua Gordon MacArthur (October 19, 1911 – July 23, 1980) was a carpenter, farmer and political figure on Prince Edward Island. He represented 2nd Prince in the Legislative Assembly of Prince Edward Island from 1970 to 1976 as a Liberal.

He was born in Poplar Grove, Prince Edward Island, the son of George Percy MacArthur and Caroline Alice Adams. He was married twice: to Edna Noye in 1933 and to Vera Jannette Smallman, the daughter of Forrest Phillips, in 1969.

First elected in the 1970 election, he won by a margin of just eight votes over Progressive Conservative leader George Key. His victory was subsequently confirmed on a judicial recount.

MacArthur resigned due to poor health in 1976. He died at the Stewart Memorial Health Centre in Tyne Valley at the age of 68.

References 

Prince Edward Island Liberal Party MLAs
1911 births
1980 deaths